Vladislav Kalinin (born 14 January 2002) is a Belarusian professional footballer who plays for Dinamo Minsk.

References

External links 
 
 

2002 births
Living people
People from Chashniki District
Sportspeople from Vitebsk Region
Belarusian footballers
Association football defenders
FC Dinamo Minsk players